Carlos Fuentes Lemus (1973–1999) was a Mexican writer, photographer, painter and director. He was the son of famous Mexican writer Carlos Fuentes and interviewer Silvia Lemus.

Life
He lived in the United States from 1978 to 1985 with his parents. At age five he won the Shankar Award of infant drawing in New Delhi, India. In 1986 he published his first poems in the magazine of Perse School.
He attended the Ecole des Roches in Verneuil-sur-Avre, France, in academic year 1985–86, along with his sister, Natasha Fuentes. 
He lived in London until 1993 and in Cambridge, Massachusetts, from 1994 to 1995. In 1998 he published a book of pictures called Retratos del Tiempo along with his father.

In 1999, he died in Puerto Vallarta, Jalisco, of complications from hemophilia. He was with his fiancée Yvette Fuentes and her son Alfredo Solis. He left an incomplete movie titled Gallo de Pelea.  Expositions of his paintings and pictures were held in Madrid and Barcelona.

References

20th-century Mexican writers
20th-century Mexican male writers
Mexican photographers
20th-century Mexican painters
Mexican male painters
1973 births
1999 deaths
Deaths from blood disease
People with haemophilia
20th-century Mexican male artists